Bob Armstrong (September 4, 1873  – January 5, 1933), was a heavyweight boxer known as the "King of the Battle Royal". He was born in Rogersville, Tennessee, but he moved with his family to Washington, Ohio when he was three years old.

Before he got into boxing, Armstrong worked with racing horses in Minneapolis, Minnesota. He made his debut on September 19 in a six-rounder against Joe Choynski in Chicago, Illinois. He lost the decision on points.

Choynski used him as a sparring partner, as did world heavyweight champion pretender Tom Sharkey and the true heavyweight champs Bob Fitzsimmons and Jim Jeffries.

World Colored Heavyweight Champ
On December 21, 1896, he won the World Colored Heavyweight Championship vacated by long-time colored champ Peter Jackson by knocking out Charley Strong  in the 19th round in a fight held in  New York City (although some sources claim the bout took place in Philadelphia on March 25, 1897). On New Year's Day 1897 he fought Joe Butler in Philadelphia and was knocked out in the second round. They met again on the sixth of March in a title bout, and Armstrong prevailed, winning by a technical knock-out in the 6th round. The following day,  he fought Frank Childs and lost to him on points in a non-title bout.

His next fight was a title bout with Sam Pruitt in San Francisco on April 23, 1897, which he won via a 1st round knock-out. His next official fights resulted in a loss on points to Joe Sheehy in a four-rounder  in June and a win against Jack Douglass  via a TKO in the 2nd  round on September 13. Some  sources also report that he beat Jack McCormick on September 25. In 1897, he  also fought two exhibitions against Tom Sharkey in May and fought two exhibitions against two different opponents, Jimmy Barry and Childs, on May 29. He fought an exhibition against Joe Choynski   in August and finished out the year with an exhibition against John Holtman in November.

In the new year of 1898, Armstrong put his championship on the line in a rematch with Childs. On January 29, 1898, and Childs took the title by knocking Armstrong out in the second round.

Post-Championship
On August 5, 1898, Armstrong fought top white heavyweight contender James J. Jeffries, who was less than a year away from winning the world's heavyweight championship, in a 10-round bout at the Lenox Athletic Club in New York City.  Armstrong lost on points.

He fought colored heavyweight champ Denver Ed Martin for the colored heavyweight title in the Crystal Palace in  London on July 25, 1902. According to the Associated Press coverage of the fight:

"Martin proved the cleverer and never gave his opponent a chance, being declared an easy winner on points at the close of the fifteenth round; Martin, it is announced, will challenge the winner of the Jeffries-Fitzsimmons fight in San Francsico."

Martin was not given a title shot and met Armstrong for a rematch in Philadelphia on December 10 According to the Daily Gazette and Bulletin:

 "The bout was fast from the start and both men narrowly escaped a knockout. The bell saved Armstrong in the third and fifth and Martin was floored six times in the fourth round."

The six-round bout ended in a no decision. In his next fight, Martin lost his title to Jack Johnson, who would one day break the color bar and become the first African American heavyweight champion of the world.

Armstrong retired after being KO-ed by Walter Johnson in Haverhill, Massachusetts on December 26, 1904. He ended his career with an official record of 17 wins (with 15 KOs) against 11 losses (in which he was KO-ed six times) and five draws. He also had a newspaper decision record of one win and one draw.

On January 29, 1932, he worked the corner for King Levinsky in his fight against Max Baer.

He died on January 5, 1933, in Chicago, Illinois.

Legacy & Honors

In 2020 award-winning author Mark Allen Baker published the first comprehensive account of The World Colored Heavyweight Championship, 1876-1937, with McFarland & Company, a leading independent publisher of academic & nonfiction books. This history traces the advent and demise of the Championship, the stories of the talented professional athletes who won it, and the demarcation of the color line both in and out of the ring.

For decades the World Colored Heavyweight Championship was a useful tool to combat racial oppression-the existence of the title a leverage mechanism, or tool, used as a technique to counter a social element, “drawing the color line.”

Professional boxing record
All information in this section is derived from BoxRec, unless otherwise stated.

Official record

All newspaper decisions are officially regarded as “no decision” bouts and are not counted in the win/loss/draw column.

Unofficial record

Record with the inclusion of newspaper decisions in the win/loss/draw column.

External links

References

1873 births
1933 deaths
Heavyweight boxers
African-American boxers
World colored heavyweight boxing champions
American male boxers
Boxers from Tennessee
Boxers from Ohio
People from Rogersville, Tennessee
People from Washington Court House, Ohio
20th-century African-American sportspeople